Radio UJAT (call sign XHCPEK-FM) is a radio station owned by the Universidad Juárez Autónoma de Tabasco in Villahermosa, Tabasco, Mexico.

History
The station was permitted as XHUJAT-FM 107.3 on January 19, 2011.

A failure to timely renew the 12-year concession led the Federal Telecommunications Institute (IFT) to issue a new one, with call sign XHCPEK-FM, effective January 18, 2023, at which time Radio UJAT moved. The new concession specified 96.1 MHz; 107.3 was not reawarded because, in 2014, Article 90 of the new Federal Telecommunications and Broadcasting Law designated 106–108 MHz as a reserved band for community and indigenous stations.

References

Radio stations in Tabasco
University radio stations in Mexico
Villahermosa
2011 establishments in Mexico
Radio stations established in 2011